Stéphanie Vivenot (born 26 March 1970) is a French former basketball player who competed in the 2000 Summer Olympics in Sydney.

She competed in the United States for the University of Toledo, setting records for blocked shots.

References

1970 births
Living people
French women's basketball players
Olympic basketball players of France
Basketball players at the 2000 Summer Olympics